Blanche Jenkins (active 1872–1915) was a British portrait painter.

Life

Jenkins was active as an exhibitor at the Society of British Artists and at the Royal Academy, where she showed some 49 works from 1872 onwards. She was also a member of the Society of Lady Artists. She exhibited her work at the Woman's Building at the 1893 World's Columbian Exposition in Chicago, Illinois.

Her painting Her Morning Ride was included in the 1905 book Women Painters of the World.

She died in 1915 and was buried on the western side of Highgate Cemetery with her father George (d.1871) and her sister Emma (d.1904).

Gallery

References 

 Catalogue of an exhibition of pictures by Miss Blanche Jenkins., London : Doré Gallery

External links
  
images of Jenkins's paintings on ArtNet

1915 deaths
Burials at Highgate Cemetery
Painters from London
19th-century British painters
British women painters
19th-century British women artists